Yaychi (also Romanized as Yāychī) is a village in Kuhestan Rural District, Qaleh Chay District, Ajab Shir County, East Azerbaijan Province, Iran. At the 2006 census, its population was 1,114, in 264 families.

References 

Populated places in Ajab Shir County